Sweden was in their second Eurovision Song Contest represented by Brita Borg with the song "Augustin". The winning song was elected in the Swedish national final: Melodifestivalen 1959. Eight semi-finals were held on the radio. During the semi-finals, Sveriges Radio decided that the winning song would represent Sweden at the Eurovision Song Contest 1959. The singer for Cannes had already been selected.

Before Eurovision

Säg det med musik: Stora Schlagertävlingen
Säg det med musik: Stora Schlagertävlingen (retroactively often referred to as Melodifestivalen 1959 was the national final for the song to represent Sweden at the Eurovision Song Contest 1959. It was held on 29 January 1959 and was the first time that this system of picking a song was being used.

Format
Already before the national final, it had been decided that Brita Borg would represent Sweden in the Eurovision Song Contest 1959. However, different artists were chosen to present the songs competing in the broadcast national selection process. Approximately 200 songs were submitted to SVT for the competition. Eight semi finals were held during Thore Erling's radio program Säg det med musik. In each semi final, an artist performed two different songs with one of them qualifying for the national final. Östen Warnerbring was the only artist to have competed in two semi finals and hence would go on to present two songs in the national final as well.

Competing entries
There is no information on the songs that did not manage to qualify from the radio semi finals. Live recordings of all eight songs competing in the grand final have survived and the full results of the final could be reconstructed.

Final
The final was broadcast on Sveriges Radio TV and Sveriges Radio P1 from Cirkus, Stockholm and the presenter was Thore Ehrling. "Augustin" was chosen by an expert jury. The winning title "Augustin" was written by Åke Gerhard and composed by Harry Sandin.

At Eurovision
On the night, "Augustin" was conducted by the host country musical director Franck Pourcel, and was interpreted by Swedish singer Brita Borg which was chosen as the representative by SVT in advance, while the interpreter in Melodifestivalen was Siw Malmkvist. The song was performed seventh in the running order, following  and preceding . At the close of voting it had received 4 points, placing Sweden 9th in a field of 11. The Swedish jury awarded its highest mark - 4, to Denmark.

The song was succeeded as the Swedish representative at the 1960 contest by "Alla andra får varann", performed by Siw Malmkvist, "Augustin" original interpreter.

Voting

References

External links
ESCSweden.com (in Swedish)
Information site about Melodifestivalen
Swedish National Final page

1959
Countries in the Eurovision Song Contest 1959
1959
Eurovision
Eurovision